was a Japanese actor. His son is actor Yukiya Kitamura. Kitamura met Shōhei Imamura when he was a student of Waseda University and became a close friend so often worked with Imamura. Kitamura joined Bungakuza theatre company and started his acting career in 1950. In 1953, he made his film debut with An Inlet of Muddy Water directed by Tadashi Imai.

Filmography

Film

Television
 Taikōki (1965) as Torii Suneemon
 Ten to Chi to (1969) as Murakami Yoshikiyo
 Haru no Sakamichi (1971) as Shima Sakon
 Akō Rōshi (1979) as Ono Kurobei
 Tokugawa Ieyasu (1983) as Mizuno Tadamasa
 Oshin (1983) as Tabokura Daigorō
 Aoi (2000) as Maeda Toshiie

Honours 
Medal with Purple Ribbon (1989)
Order of the Rising Sun, 4th Class, Gold Rays with Rosette (1997)

References

Japanese male film actors
20th-century Japanese male actors
1927 births
2007 deaths
Recipients of the Medal with Purple Ribbon
Recipients of the Order of the Rising Sun, 4th class